16 December is a 2002 Indian Hindi-language action thriller film directed by Mani Shankar, based on a plot to destroy the capital city of India, New Delhi with a nuclear bomb on 16 December 2001 – 30 years after the surrender of Pakistan at the end of the Indo-Pakistani War of 1971.

The film's title comes from the historical date of 16 December 1971 (which is also Bangladesh's Victory Day), commemorating the day Pakistan signed the document of Liberation of Bangladesh.

Plot 
Major General Vir Vijay Singh, Vikram, Sheeba, and Victor, who are Indian Revenue Service officers belonging to the Department of Revenue Intelligence, and have been wrongly implicated in the killing of their corrupt superior officer and removed from service, are hired by the Chief of the same agency to investigate a series of large money laundering. Vikram and Sheeba share some romance. The team is equipped with hi-tech equipment such as mini spy cameras, computers, the internet and other communication devices. Through various encounters, they discover that the money is being transferred to a Swiss Bank account. By means of an Indian employee, Sonal Joshi working in the Auckland, New Zealand branch of the same bank, they investigate the account in New Zealand and, with her help, find that the money is being transferred to an international terrorist organization named Kaala Khanjar. This organization, working in conjunction with terrorist Dost Khan, manages to smuggle a Russian-made nuclear bomb into India. Dost Khan plans to explode the nuclear uvva on the same day, 16 December.

Although the ruling dictator of Pakistan surrendered unconditionally to India during the Indo-Pakistani War of 1971, some of the hard-lined Pakistani soldiers were bitter and angry at the surrender, as they wanted to continue fighting the Indians until their last breath. They retreated in silence and later formed their own groups of communal soldiers to carry out terrorists attacks against neighboring India.

Led by Dost Khan, a hardliner Pakistani army officer, who, against his wishes, had to surrender after the end of the 1971 war, the terrorists planned to take an act of revenge by having a nuclear explosion in the heart of New Delhi. They transport it into a music competition disguised as a musical instrument. When Vir Vijay Singh discovers the plan, he plans to find out the location of the nuclear bomb as soon as possible by taking the help of Remote Radiation Sensors in satellites and innumerable beggars in the city. This helps the team zero in on the location.

After they overpower most of the terrorists in a commando operation, Dost Khan learns about it and sets the nuclear bomb to explode in a few minutes. This creates a lot of problem for Vijay Vir Singh, as the bomb can be defused only by the exclusive voice command of Dost Khan saying: Dulhan Ki Vidaai Ka Waqt Badalna Hai. They adopt a novel way to do it by speaking to Dost Khan and making him say fragments of this sentence without making him realize that it was being done to defuse the bomb. After the conversation is over, they synthesize the sentence to defuse the bomb just in time.

Cast 
 Danny Denzongpa as Major General Vir Vijay Singh IRS
 Milind Soman as Vikram IRS / Vijay Chauhan
 Dipannita Sharma as Sheeba
 Sushant Singh as Victor
 Aditi Gowitrikar as Sonal Joshi
 Gulshan Grover as Dost Khan
 Vinay Varma as Shiv Charan Shukla
 Reza as Irfan
 Sajeel Parakh
 Sohil Mathur as Pappu (informer)
 Shah Rukh Khan  (cameo)

Critical reception
16 December received mostly positive reviews from critics in India and abroad. Ronjita Kulkarni of Rediff.com gave the movie 5/5 stars and wrote, "For a first-timer, director Mani Shankar does a valiant job with 16 December. It has four songs, three of which appear in the background, but it certainly does not follow the routine song-and-dance formula. 16 December entertains as well makes you think". 
Taran Adarsh of Bollywood Hungama gave the movie 4/5 stars and wrote, "The film does have a love angle though there is no undue focus on the romantic couple. Now for the film. In 16 December, Mani Shankar has tried to explore white-collar crime. The premise being, millions of rupees leave the Indian shores daily to Swiss bank accounts. The account holders always remain a secret. What the director tries to do is trace this movement of money from the grass-roots level".
Rachit Gupta of Filmfare rated the movie −4/5 stars, stating, "16 December moves at a brisk pace. Mani Shankar does not waste time on unnecessary details. The film requires a fair amount of concentration to understand the chain of events".
DNA gave the movie 5/5 stars and said that, one of the best Hindi spy films that had ever come out, it is India's equivalent to Brian De Palma's Mission: Impossible.

Soundtrack

See also 
 Bangladesh Liberation War
 Indo-Pakistani War of 1971
List of films about 1971 India-Pakistan war

References

External links 
 
 

2002 films
2002 action thriller films
2000s spy thriller films
Apocalyptic films
Films about intelligence agencies
Indian action thriller films
Indian spy thriller films
Films scored by Karthik Raja
Films about criminals
India–Pakistan relations in popular culture
Films about nuclear war and weapons
Films about organised crime in India
2000s Hindi-language films
Military of Pakistan in films
Films directed by Mani Shankar